Stephan Streker is a Belgian film director and screenwriter.

Biography 
Stephan Streker was born in Brussels, and first became a journalist with the aim of meeting the people he admired most in the world – filmmakers. In this capacity, he published lengthy interviews for the Belgian press.

He also worked as a film critic for both radio and print media and as a photographer (artistic, press and portraiture), producing numerous album covers.

In parallel to these occupations, Stephan was a sports journalist, specializing in soccer and boxing.

A Wedding has been selected in over 40 Film Festivals worldwide, earning more than 15 awards. The movie has been nominated at the César 2018 in the category Best Foreign Film.

In addition to his job as a filmmaker, Streker is also a soccer consultant for Belgian national television (RTBF), in particular for all games involving the Red Devils (the national team), and also for the weekly television show La Tribune.

Filmography

Short movies 
 1993 : Shadow Boxing
 1996 : Mathilde, Pierre's Wife (Mathilde, la femme de Pierre)
 1998 : Day of the Fight (Le jour du combat), documentary

Feature films 
 2004 : 
 2013 :  
 2017 : A Wedding (Noces)
 2021 : L'ennemi

References

External links

1964 births
Living people
Belgian film directors
Belgian screenwriters
Mass media people from Brussels